The 2021 NWSL Draft was the ninth annual meeting of National Women's Soccer League (NWSL) franchises to select eligible college players. It was held on January 13, 2021. Due to the COVID-19 pandemic, it was the first NWSL Draft to be held virtually via videoconferencing and web streaming.

Format
 All 10 teams of the National Women's Soccer League (NWSL) take turns making their selections over four rounds, with 10 picks per round. Draft order in each round was determined by the reverse order of standings after the preliminary stage of the 2020 NWSL Challenge Cup, with the exceptions being Racing Louisville FC taking the first selection as an expansion team and Orlando Pride slotting into the fourth spot as decided by the board of governors after the team was unable to participate in the Challenge Cup.
 The Kansas City expansion team took over all player-related assets (including draft picks) of defunct team Utah Royals FC.
 The draft was broadcast live via the NWSL's official Twitch channel.
 Final list of players who registered was released on January 12, 2021.

COVID-19 pandemic
Due to the COVID-19 pandemic, the NWSL made the following changes to the draft regulations that apply only to the 2021 NWSL Draft:
 Due to the disruption of college soccer and resulting NCAA D-I spring season in 2021, the NWSL applied for and received a waiver from the NCAA so that D-I players who are drafted could choose to report immediately for the 2021 NWSL season and forfeit their remaining collegiate eligibility, or remain with their collegiate teams until the conclusion of the NCAA D-I spring season in May 2021.
 The NWSL waived registration requirements so that all D-I players who had exhausted three years of collegiate soccer eligibility prior to the 2020–21 academic year were automatically eligible to be drafted.
 The NWSL playing rights of drafted players will be held until the start of the 2022 preseason rather than the end of the 2021 season as was the case previously.

Results

Key

Picks

Notable undrafted players
Below is a list of undrafted rookies who appeared in a competitive NWSL game in 2021.

Trades 
Round 1:

Round 2:

Round 3:

Round 4:

Summary
In 2021, a total of 28 colleges had players selected. Of these, five had a player drafted to the NWSL for the first time: Boston University, Kansas State, Louisville, UNC Wilmington, and Vanderbilt.

Schools with multiple draft selections

Selections by college athletic conference

Selections by position

See also
 List of drafts held by the NWSL
 List of National Women's Soccer League draftees by college team
 2021 National Women's Soccer League season

References

External links
 

National Women's Soccer League drafts
Draft
NWSL  Draft
NWSL Draft